Asmat is a Papuan language cluster of West New Guinea.

Languages
The principal varieties, distinct enough to be considered separate languages, are:
Kamrau Bay (Sabakor):
Casuarina Coast (Kaweinag), the most divergent
North and Central Asmat
Citak (Kaünak)
North Asmat
Central Asmat (dialects: Keenok, Sokoni, Keenakap, Kawenak)

Ethnically, speakers are either Asmat or Citak.

Evolution

Below are some reflexes of proto-Trans-New Guinea proposed by Pawley (2012):

Verbs
In Flamingo Bay Asmat, light verbs are combined with adjuncts to form predicative expressions.

e- ‘do’
atow e- /play do/ ‘play’
caj e- /copulate do/ ‘copulate’
yan e- /ear do/ ‘listen’
yi- ‘say’
po yi- /paddle say/ ‘paddle’
yan yi- /ear say/ ‘hear’
mesa yi- /saliva say/ ‘spit’
af- ‘hit’
yaki af- /sneeze hit/ ‘sneeze’
namir af- /death hit/ ‘die’
omop af- /blow hit/ ‘beat’

References

External links 
 PARADISEC archive of Asmat language recordings
Asmat. New Guinea World.
Kamrau Bay. New Guinea World.

Asmat-Kamoro languages
Languages of western New Guinea